Stambridge is a civil parish in the Rochford district in Essex, England. It is located north of the River Roach between Rochford and Paglesham. The parish includes the village of Great Stambridge.

The name "Stambridge" means "stone bridge". The only bridge in the parish is now brick-built over the small stream that rises in Canewdon, flows under the road just south of the Royal Oak, and into the Roach near "Waldens".

Parish
Stambridge Parish formerly consisted of two parishes, Great Much, or Magna and Little or Parva. The parishes were merged on 1 April 1934. The centre of population in Great Stambridge has moved from around the church to the Royal Oak Inn area.

The combined parish consists of approximately three square miles. The boundaries are, in the east, Biggins Farm (Paglesham Road); in the west Little Stambridge Hall; the south the River Roach ; and in a line crossing Stambridge Road at "Richmonds" and number 159 Stambridge Road.

The modern parish includes the hamlet of Ballards Gore.

Stambridge Mill
There was a tide mill at Stambridge for hundreds of years. It Rankins the Millers owned the building when it burned down in April 1965. It was demolished in 2014.

Sport and leisure
The local football club, Corinthians FC, currently plays in the Essex Olympian League.

References

External links

Rochford District Council

Civil parishes in Essex
Rochford District